120P/Mueller, also known as Mueller 1, is a periodic comet in the Solar System.

References

External links 
 Orbital simulation from JPL (Java) / Horizons Ephemeris
 120P/Mueller 1 – Seiichi Yoshida @ aerith.net
 120P at Kronk's Cometography

Periodic comets
0120
120P
Comets in 2013
19871018